is a former Japanese football player and manager. He played for Japan national team.

Club career
Ogura was born in Suzuka on July 6, 1973. After graduating from high school, he joined Nagoya Grampus Eight in 1992. In 1993, he moved to Eerste Divisie club Excelsior on loan. He returned Nagoya in 1994. In 1995, the club won Emperor's Cup first major title in club history. At Final, he scored 2 goals against Sanfrecce Hiroshima. However he got hurt in 1996. He operated several times and returned, but his opportunities to play decreased. In the early 2000s, he played for JEF United Ichihara (2000), Tokyo Verdy (2001) and Consadole Sapporo (2002). In 2003, he moved to J2 League club Ventforet Kofu. He played as regular player in 2003 and 2004. He retired in 2005.

National team career
On May 22, 1994, Ogura debuted for Japan national team against Australia. On May 29, Ogura scored a goal against France. He also played at 1994 Asian Games. He played 5 games and scored 1 goal for Japan in 1994.

Coaching career
In June 2015, Ogura became an assistant for general manager at Nagoya Grampus. In 2016, he became a manager. However he resigned in August.

Club statistics

National team statistics

Managerial statistics

References

External links
 
 Japan National Football Team Database
 
 

1973 births
Living people
Association football people from Mie Prefecture
Japanese footballers
Japan international footballers
J1 League players
J2 League players
Eerste Divisie players
Nagoya Grampus players
Excelsior Rotterdam players
JEF United Chiba players
Tokyo Verdy players
Hokkaido Consadole Sapporo players
Ventforet Kofu players
Japanese expatriate footballers
Expatriate footballers in the Netherlands
Japanese expatriate sportspeople in the Netherlands
Japanese football managers
J1 League managers
Nagoya Grampus managers
Association football forwards
Footballers at the 1994 Asian Games
Asian Games competitors for Japan